Kingston Airport  is a public airport located two miles (3 km) east of the central business district (CBD) of Kingston, in Lander County, Nevada, United States.

Facilities 
 Runway 7/25: 3,700 x 80 ft. (1,128 x 24 m), surface: gravel/dirt
 Runway 16/34: 3,072 x 60 ft. (936 x 18 m), surface: gravel/dirt

References

External links 

Airports in Nevada
Buildings and structures in Lander County, Nevada
Transportation in Lander County, Nevada
Bureau of Land Management